Tuamotu kingfisher has been split into the following species:

 Niau kingfisher, 	Todiramphus gertrudae
 Mangareva kingfisher,  Todiramphus gambieri

Birds by common name